The R813 road is a regional road in Dublin, Ireland.

The official definition of the R813 from the Roads Act 1993 (Classification of Regional Roads) Order 2006 states:

R813: City Quay, Dublin

Between its junction with R105 at Matt Talbot Memorial Bridge and its junction with R802 at Pearse Street via City Quay, Sir John Rogerson's Quay, Cardiff Lane and Macken Street all in the city of Dublin.

See also
Roads in Ireland
Regional road

References

Regional roads in the Republic of Ireland
Roads in County Dublin